Time for Change may refer to:

 Time for Change (Apache Indian album), 2005
 Time for Change (Wendy Moten album), 1995
Time for Change (Robbie Williams song), 2019
 Time for Change (EP), a 1999 EP by Capdown
 Time-for-change model, a formula for predicting the results of American presidential elections devised by Alan Abramowitz

See also
Time for a Change (disambiguation)